Friedrich Wilhelm Albrecht    (15 October 1894 – 16 March 1984) was a Lutheran missionary and pastor who was the superintendent at Hermannsburg Mission in Central Australia from 1926 - 1952 where he made a significant contribution.

Early life 

Albrecht was born on 15 October 1894 at Pławanice in Poland to Ferdinand and Helene Albrecht and is the eldest of there 10 children. Albrecht initially attended the local village school before he moved to study and live at the Hermannsburg Mission, in Germany, in 1913 and he graduate in 1924.

World War I did interrupt his studies and, due to a childhood injury making him lame in one leg, Albrecht served in the German medical corps on the Russian front. He was awarded an Iron Cross for tending wounded soldiers when under fire.

After completing his studies he received a call to work at Hermannsburg Mission, 125 km from Alice Springs, but before he could begin he received English tuition in the United States. Minna Maria Margaretha Gevers, who Albrecht met in Germany, followed him there and they married in Winnipeg, Canada on 14 September 1925. Following their marriage they sailed to Sydney where they arrived on 18 October 1925 before immediately travelling to South Australia.

In South Australia, at Nuriootpa, Albrecht was ordained as a pastor in the United Evangelical Lutheran Church of Australia on 14 February 1926.

Life in the Northern Territory 

Albrecht reached Hermannsburg on 16 April 1926 where he was the replacement for Carl Strehlow who had died unexpectedly in October 1922. Gerhardt Johannsen delivered the couple to the mission, driving them from Oodnadatta, via Alice Springs.

Albrecht's first priority after arriving at the mission was to learn Arrernte and he was assisted in this by Moses Tjalkabota Uraikuria, an Arrernte man of high degree and Christian evangelist, who served as a teacher and guide to the missionaries at Hermannsburg (and T.G.H. Strehlow). After achieving language sufficiency Albrecht would continue work on translating the bible, delivering sermons and training Aboriginal evangelists.

Albrecht arrived in Hermannsburg during a period of extreme drought and there had already been thoughts of closure; between 1926 - 1929 it is recorded that 41 of the 51 children born at the mission died and this ill health also affected Albrecht's family with his infant daughter Helene weighing less at four then she had at two. Adults were also affected with some deaths from scurvy and general ill health, primarily from eczema, kidney disease and tuberculosis. Spurned on by this tragedy Albrecht advocated for the construction of the Kuprilya Springs Pipeline, which the Lutheran Mission Board refused to support, and he ultimately received the funds required from artists Jessie Traill and Una and Violet Teague. The completion of this pipeline, and the associated fresh fruit and vegetables they were able to grow, infant mortality decreased significantly. Albrecht later lamented:

Albrecht had a deep respect for Aboriginal spirituality but he saw no way to reconcile it with Christian faith. Because of these views Albrecht removed and disposed of the Tjurunga in the sacred Manangananga Cave; Carl Strehlow, who shared Albrecht's beliefs had always acknowledged the importance of this site and the sacred objects and had left it untouched.

Despite this Albrecht is remembered as an advocate for Aboriginal people, who was concerned for their material and social welfare. A part of this in action was his work with Charles Duguid and T.G.H Strehlow to establish Aboriginal settlements like Areyonga and Yuendumu. He was also instrumental in establishing the arts and crafts industry in Hermannsburg as a way for the community to make money, especially when tourists began arriving in the 1930s. He also encouraged Albert Namatjira who he helped sell his paintings. Albrecht also operated the mission as a working cattle station and established a tannery; the hides of which were used for leather-work products.

In 1952 Albrecht and his family moved to Alice Springs following his wife, Minna, experiencing regular ill health. Albrecht continued his work as a pastor in Alice Springs until his retirement in 1962.

In 1958 he was appointed MBE.

Later life 
In 1962 the Albrecht's retired to Linden Park in South Australia; although he continued to carry out pastoral duties.

Albrecht died on 16 March 1984.

Publications 

A full list of publications are available on Trove.

Legacy 

Albrecht Drive and Oval in Alice Springs are named for him as well as Albrecht Road in Kintore.

References 

1894 births
1984 deaths
People from the Northern Territory